Ion Horvath (born 12 August 1912, date of death unknown) was a Romanian wrestler. He competed in the men's Greco-Roman featherweight at the 1936 Summer Olympics.

References

1912 births
Year of death missing
Romanian male sport wrestlers
Olympic wrestlers of Romania
Wrestlers at the 1936 Summer Olympics
People from Lugoj